Alhar/Alhad Bikaneri (Late Shri.Alhar Bikaneri) (17 May 1937 – 17 June 2009) was a renowned Hindi Hasya Ras(Humour) and Urdu poet of  of India. His original name was Shyamlal Sharma. He was born on 17 May 1937 in a small village named Bikaner, Rewari district, Haryana, India.

Awards and recognition 

Honored with “Hasya Ratna” he is considered as one of the most famous Hindi  humour poet who used to recite poems by singing. He was considered as expert of Chandd Kavita(Rydhym Poems). He was awarded & honoured with India’s some of the most prestigious Awards of Hindi humour poetry like Theetoli Award Delhi(1981), Kaka Hathrasi Award(1986), Akhil Bharteeya Nagrik Parishad(1993), Yatha-Sambhav Award Ujjain(1997), Kavya Gaurav Award Delhi(1998), Narendra- Mohan Award, Maanas Award(2000), Tepa Award Ujjain(2004), Vyangya- Shri Award(2004) & Athasaas -Shikar Award(2007).
In 1996 his work was appreciated by Honorable President of India Dr. Shankar Dayal Sharma. In 2000 Delhi State Government honoured him with  Kaka Hathrasi Sammaan which is considered as one of the most prestigious award of Hindi Humor Poetry in India. In 2004, Haryana State Govt. awarded him with  Haryana Gaurav Award. His popularity was not only limited in India but was also known outside India for his work. Haryana State Sathiya Academy had declared "Aditya-Alhar Hasya Samman", in order to honour contribution in literature. This award was declared under "Sahityakar Samman Yogna" . Since 2012 this award will be given every year to motivate for contribution in literature . This award carries a cash price of INR 100,000

Life 
Alhar was born on 17 May 1937 in Bikaner, Haryana. He was only son in family. His Father name was Sh. Chuutanlal Sharma and Mother’s name was Smt. Parvati Devi.Since childhood he was fascinated for music, literature and stage shows. But his father always wanted him to become an Engineer. In class 10th he was passed in first division & got scholarship. He took admission in Science stream at Aheer College Rewari, Haryana. After second year of college, he dropped studies. In Dec 1955 he started his first job at Custodian office Gurgaon, Haryana. He worked there for three months until Mar 1956. In April 1956 he joined Telegraph training centre at Saharanpur . But soon he fell ill with malaria & typhoid. He was admitted to Irwin Hospital Delhi and recovered.

Death and memory events 
On 17 June 2009, at age 72, Alhar died. He had been suffering from respiratory health problems. He was admitted to a hospital in Noida, Uttar Pradesh. In his memory every year on his birthday, various functions are organised by his family and friends. In 2010, Kavi sammelan was organised which was attended by various famous poets . On the occasion "Alhar ji" was remembered & poets expressed their feelings & respect for him by dedicating there poems for Alharji. In 2011,on his 74th birthday, Haryana Chief Minister Honorable Mr. Bhoopendra Singh Hooda had released his last book " Man mast hua" at Haryana Bhawan, New delhi. In 2012,Kaka Hathrasi honouring Alhar Bikaneri with Kaka Hathrasi award(1986). On his 75th Birthday a large gathering was organised was Akhil Bharatiya Kavi Sammelan organised at LTG Auditorium by Haryana Sahitya Academy and Chetna India of Delhi. This program was attended by Delhi Assembly Speaker, many ministers & poets was also available on the occasion.

Poems 
About his writing skills Dr. Devendra Arya said "Alhar ji humor is like a ray of glowing light in darkness. He is expert in expressing the pain, tears using his humor skills that the message goes to the heart of person directly with a great impact without causing any hurting".

23 Jan 1971, he participated for the first time in Lal Qila  Kavi sammelan and recited his poem.

Influences 
In 1962 he started his writing career as Ghazal writer with the pen name of "Mahir Bikaneri". During that time he was working as clerk in main post office, Kashmiri gate, Delhi. One day while working one thought clicked in his mind . He looked around in office & wrote his first humour poem "Afsar Ji ki Amar Kahani". When he narrated that poem in office, it had created a magic. Everyone liked & appreciated it very much. In 1967. Those days he was very much impressed & motivated with writing work of "Shri Kaka Hathrasi". In that motivation he wrote few humour poems also. One day he was sharing his poems to one of his friend "Shayar Razaa Amrohi". After listening those poems Amrohiji suggested him to write for Hindi Humor Poetry . This appreciation was the beginning . But final turning point in his poetic career was the book Kaka Ki Phuljhariya. After reading this book, he decided to stop writing serious songs & Ghazals & entered to the world of humorous poems. He changed his Pen name to "Alhar/Alhad Bikaneri" & start writing for Hindi Humour poetry .
After this, his long journey of humorous poetry was started . He touched heights of successes & glory and gave special contribution to Hindi Poetry & literature. He did his first Kavi sammelan in 1967 at North Block, Delhi, in front of Dada Bhawani Prasad Mishr. There he narrated his poem titled Kamaal Dekte Hain . After listening poem Dada was very much impressed with Alharji . He gave his blessing to him & motivated him to keep going on this journey of Humor Poems. In 1968 one evening, his one friend Krish Swarup, took him to house of Shri. Gopal Prasad Vyas. Those days Vyasji was residing at Bhagirath Palace Delhi. Alhar was excited to present his poems in front of Vyas ji. When he finished his poem, Vyas ji commented him to first study & get in-depth knowledge of literature. He asked him to study the complete Literature which was written by him & thoroughly analyse it. After complete learning then start & create something new of his own . If able to do that then only come back to him again. This conversation had strong impact on Alhar. Again life was giving him challenge. Either take the challenge or stop writing. He accepted this challenge. For next two complete years he studied literature & improved his skills. After 2yrs of strong hard work, finally in 1970 Vyasji had accepted Alhar as his student . In Nov 1970, Vyasji asked Alhar to travel with him to Kolkatta . There in traditional & ceremonial way he accepted him as his student. 23 Jan 1971, for the first time he participated in Lal Qila Kavi sammelan & recite his poem.
In the background of his most poems we can see a devotional background. The reason for this is linked with his personal life. When he was only 22 years old his father died. As an asset to his son, he left one Musical Instrument, Some Hindu Religious Books Ramayana, Gita-Manthan, Ghandhi-Manthan, Ghandhi Vani, Bhuddha Vani, Tamil Ved. In Feb 1970, Alhar was reading one of the religious books and found a Line written by  the famous Urdu Poet, Nazeer Akbarbaadi, “ Poore hain Wahi Mard , Jo Har Haal Mai Khush Hain”. After reading these line he felt as if some magic had happened and a chain of new thoughts originated in his mind. He felt he found a treasure which he was searching from years. Using these lines he wrote his own poem named “ Har Haal Mei Khush Hain” and later this poem was incorporated in his book Mun Mast Hua.
All over India his popularity was at the peak. The poem " Har Haal Mei Khush Hain " poem gives a lesson to keep patience at any situation in life. Accept the challenges of life and face them boldly. A Person should be able to keep himself happy in all situations. Life is never the same, sometimes tough and other times tougher, but instead of crying about the situation the person who boldly face them, accept the things and remain happy is the man in real way. Value the things which have been offered to you and accept it as a best gift from god.

Published 
His work & poems was published by many magazines. In most popular weekly magazine "Saptahik Hindustan" the first poem which was published in this magazine was Har haal mei khush hain. Later many more poems were published by this magazine. It was in fact accepted by Alharji the reason for his & his poems popularity goes to that time publisher of "Saptahik Hindustan" Mr. Manohar Shyam Joshi, who had given a platform through his magazine to make it possible to convey poems to a general man at National level. In just two years time, Alhar became a National Poet.

Some of the most famous poems are Hasya Kawaali-Moongphali, Vote Mangan Nikle Neta ji, Market Value, Har Haal Mai Khush Hai, Anphad Dhanno, Ghaat-Ghaat Ghoomei, Chunaav Ghosna-Patra.

Other work 
Apart from writing ghazals and poems, he also worked for cinema. In 1986 he had written the story, script and songs for a regional Haryana Language movie named Choti Saali. He regularly used to recite poems from Akashvaani (India Radio service) & Doordarshan (India TV Service). His poems were regularly printed in newspapers & Hindi magazines. He wrote many books. The most popular of them were Bhaj Pyare Tu Sita Raam, Ghaat-Ghaat Ghoome, Abhi Hasta Hun, Ab Toh Aansso Paunch, Bhaisa Peewae Somras, Thaath Ghazal ke, Unchuae Haath, Jai Madam Ki Bol Re, Har Haal Mai Khush hai, Khol Na Dena Dwar and Mun Mast Hua.

References 

 Home
 Alhad Bikaneri « रचनाएँ
 Geeta-Kavita.com: Collection of Popular Hindi Poems - Maahishmati Samrajyam : Baahubali:Manoj Muntashir-Hindi poem
 Haryana Guv, CM mourn death of poet Alhar Bikaneri
 http://www.thehindu.com/todays-paper/tp-national/tp-newdelhi/alhar-bikaneri-remembered/article3434808.ece?
 The Hindu : New Delhi News : Veteran poet passes away
 The Tribune, Chandigarh, India - Haryana Plus

Indian male poets
Poets from Haryana
Urdu-language poets from India
Hindi-language writers
1937 births
2009 deaths
20th-century Indian poets
21st-century Indian poets